Paraire is a surname and given name. Notable people include: 

Surname
Edward Lewis Paraire (1826–1882), British theatre and music hall architect

Given name
Paraire Karaka Paikea (1894–1943), New Zealand Māori politician
Paraire Tomoana (died 1946), Māori political leader
Tapihana Paraire Paikea (1920–1963), New Zealand politician